Henri Troyat (born Lev Aslanovich Tarasov;  – 2 March 2007) was a Russian-born French author, biographer, historian and novelist.

Early life
Lev Aslanovich Tarasov (Lev Aslanovich Tarasov) was born in Moscow to parents of mixed heritage, including Armenian, Russian, German and Georgian. In his autobiography, he states that his surname is Armenian (Torossian), while his maternal grandmother was German and his maternal grandfather was of mixed Georgian and Armenian descent. His family fled Russia after the outbreak of the revolution. After a long exodus taking them to the Caucasus on to Crimea and later by sea to Istanbul and then Venice, the family finally settled in Paris in 1920, where young Troyat was schooled and later earned a law degree. The stirring and tragic events of this flight across half of Europe are vividly recounted by Troyat in Tant que la terre durera.

Career
Troyat received his first literary award, Le prix du roman populaire, at the age of twenty-four, and by twenty-seven, he was awarded the Prix Goncourt. He published more than 100 books, novels and biographies, among them those of Anton Chekhov, Catherine the Great, Rasputin, Fyodor Dostoyevsky, Ivan the Terrible and Leo Tolstoy. Troyat's best-known work is La neige en deuil, which was adapted as an English-language film in 1956 under the title The Mountain.

Troyat was elected as a member of the Académie Française in 1959. At the time of his death, he was the longest-serving member.

Personal life and death
Troyat's first marriage produced a son before ending in divorce. He later married a widow with a young daughter whom he raised as his own. He died on 4 March 2007 in Paris.

Bibliography
 1935: Faux Jour (Plon)
 1935: Le Vivier (Plon)
 1936: Grandeur nature (Plon)
 1937: La Clef de voûte (Plon)
 1938: L’Araigne (Plon)
 1939: La Fosse commune (Plon)
 1940: Dostoïevski (Fayard)
 1941: Le Jugement de Dieu (Plon)
 1942: Le mort saisit le vif (Plon)
 1945: Du Philanthrope à la Rouquine (Flammarion)
 1945: Le Signe du taureau (Plon)
 1946: Les Ponts de Paris (Flammarion)
 1946: Pouchkine (Plon)
 1946: Les Vivants, pièce en trois actes (Bonne)
 1947: Tant que la terre durera, t. I (La Table ronde)
 1948: Le Sac et la Cendre, Tant que la terre durera, t. II (La Table ronde)
 1948: La Case de l’oncle Sam (La Table ronde)
 1949: Sébastien, pièce en trois actes (Opéra)
 1950: Étrangers sur la terre, Tant que la terre durera, t. III (La Table ronde)
 1951: La Tête sur les épaules (Plon)
 1952: La Neige en deuil (Flammarion)
 1952: L’Étrange Destin de Lermontov (Plon)
 1953: Les Semailles et les Moissons, t. I (Plon)
 1955: De Gratte-ciel en cocotier (Plon)
 1955: Amélie, Les Semailles et les Moissons, t. II (Plon)
 1956: La Maison des bêtes heureuses (Bias)
 1956: Sainte Russie, souvenirs et réflexions suivi de l’Assassinat d’Alexandre II (Grasset)
 1956: La Grive, Les Semailles et les Moissons, t. III (Plon)
 1957: Tendre et violente Elisabeth, Les Semailles et les Moissons, t. IV (Plon)
 1958: La Rencontre, Les Semailles et les Moissons, t. V (Plon)
 1958: Naissance d’une Dauphine (Gallimard)
 1959: La Vie quotidienne en Russie au temps du dernier tsar (Hachette)
 1959: La Lumière des justes. Tome I : Les Compagnons du Coquelicot. (Flammarion)
 1960: La Lumière des justes. Tome II : La Barynia. (Flammarion)
 1961: La Lumière des justes. Tome III : La Gloire des vaincus. (Flammarion)
 1962: La Lumière des justes. Tome IV : Les Dames de Sibérie. (Flammarion)
 1963: Une extrême amitié (La Table ronde)
 1963: La Lumière des justes. Tome V : Sophie ou la Fin des combats.  (Flammarion)
 1964: Le Geste d’Ève (Flammarion)
 1965: Les Eygletière, t. I (Flammarion)
 1965: Tolstoï (Fayard)
 1966: La Faim des lionceaux, Les Eygletière, t. II (Flammarion)
 1967: La Malandre, Les Eygletière, t. III (Flammarion)
 1968: Les Héritiers de l’avenir. Tome I : Le Cahier. (Flammarion)
 1969: Les Héritiers de l’avenir. Tome II : Cent un coups de canon. (Flammarion)
 1970: Les Héritiers de l’avenir. Tome III : L’Éléphant blanc. (Flammarion)
 1971: Gogol (Flammarion)
 1972: La Pierre, la Feuille et les Ciseaux (Flammarion)
 1973: Anne Prédaille (Flammarion)
 1974: Le Moscovite, t. I (Flammarion)
 1974: Les Désordres secrets, Le Moscovite, t. II (Flammarion)
 1975: Les Feux du matin, Le Moscovite, t. III (Flammarion)
 1976: Un si long chemin (Stock)
 1976: Le Front dans les nuages (Flammarion)
 1976: Grimbosq (Flammarion)
 1977: Catherine la Grande (Flammarion)
 1978: Le Prisonnier n° I (Flammarion)
 1979: Pierre le Grand (Flammarion)
 1980: Viou (Flammarion)
 1981: Alexandre I er (Flammarion)
 1982: Le Pain de l’étranger (Flammarion)
 1982: Ivan le Terrible (Flammarion)
 1983: La Dérision (Flammarion)
 1984: Tchekhov (Flammarion)
 1984: Marie Karpovna (Flammarion)
 1985: Tourgueniev (Flammarion)
 1985: Le Bruit solitaire du cœur (Flammarion)
 1986: À demain, Sylvie (Flammarion)
 1986: Gorki (Flammarion)
 1987: Le Troisième Bonheur (Flammarion)
 1988: Toute ma vie sera mensonge (Flammarion)
 1988: Flaubert (Flammarion)
 1989: Maupassant (Flammarion)
 1989: La Gouvernante française (Flammarion)
 1990: La Femme de David (Flammarion)
 1990: Alexandre II, le tsar libérateur (Flammarion)
 1991: Aliocha (Flammarion)
 1991: Nicolas II, le dernier tsar (Flammarion)
 1992: Youri (Flammarion)
 1992: Zola (Flammarion)
 1993: Verlaine (Flammarion)
 1993: Le Chant des Insensés (Flammarion)
 1994: Baudelaire (Flammarion)
 1994: Le Marchand de masques (Flammarion)
 1995: Balzac (Flammarion)
 1995: Le Défi d’Olga (Flammarion)
 1996: Votre très humble et très obéissant serviteur (Flammarion)
 1996: Raspoutine (Flammarion)
 1997: L’Affaire Crémonnière (Flammarion)
 1997: Juliette Drouet (Flammarion)
 1998: Le Fils du satrape (Grasset)
 1998: Terribles tsarines (Grasset)
 1999: Les turbulences d’une grande famille (Grasset)
 1999: Namouna ou la chaleur animale (Grasset)
 2000: Nicolas Ier (Librairie académique Perrin)
 2000: La Ballerine de Saint-Pétersbourg (Plon)
 2001: Marina Tsvetaena : L'éternelle insurgée (Grasset)
 2001: La Fille de l'écrivain (Grasset)
 2002: L'Étage des bouffons (Grasset)
 2004: La Fiancée de l'ogre (Grasset)
 2004: Alexandre III (Grasset)
 2004: La Baronne et le musicien (Grasset)
 2005: Alexandre Dumas. Le cinquième mousquetaire (Grasset)
 2006: La Traque (Grasset)
 2006: Pasternak (Grasset)
 2008: Boris Godunov (Flammarion)
 2009: Le Pas du juge (Bernard de Fallois)
 2009: La folie des anges (Bernard de Fallois)
 2010: "Trois mères, trois fils"  (Bernard de Fallois)

References

External links
 L'Académie française 
 official site 
BBC "Eminent French writer Troyat dies" 5 March 2007

1911 births
2007 deaths
Writers from Paris
20th-century French novelists
21st-century French novelists
Members of the Académie Française
Prix Goncourt winners
White Russian emigrants to France
French people of Armenian descent
French people of Russian descent
Russian people of Armenian descent
Ethnic Armenian historians
Grand Croix of the Légion d'honneur
Burials at Montparnasse Cemetery
Lycée Pasteur (Neuilly-sur-Seine) alumni
French male novelists
20th-century French male writers
21st-century French male writers
French male non-fiction writers